Mr. Saturday Night is a 1992 American comedy-drama film that marked the directorial debut of its star, Billy Crystal.

It focuses on the rise and fall of Buddy Young Jr., a stand-up comedian. Crystal produced and co-wrote the screenplay with the writing duo Babaloo Mandel and Lowell Ganz.  It was filmed from November 1991 to March 1992 and released on September 23, 1992, by Columbia Pictures. Co-star David Paymer received an Academy Award nomination for Best Supporting Actor.

Plot
Stand-up comedian Buddy Young Jr. became a television star with the help of his brother and manager, Stan, but alienated many of those closest to him once his career began to fade.

Through a series of flashbacks, the brothers are seen during childhood entertaining their family in the living room. The older Buddy continues his career as a comic in the Catskills, where he meets his future wife, Elaine.

As Buddy's fame grows, so does his ego. He hits the big time with his own Saturday night television show. But despite the warnings of his brother, Buddy uses offensive material on the air, costing him his show and causing his career to suffer, officially ending when his stand-up act on the Ed Sullivan Show is scheduled right after the Beatles' first US appearance, leading to his act being ignored and cut short. Furious over being snubbed, he goes into an offensive tirade and quits.

As an older man, long past his prime, Buddy is estranged from Stan as well as from his daughter, Susan. A chance at redemption comes when a young agent named Annie Wells finds him work and even gets Buddy a shot at a role in a top director's new film. Buddy nevertheless gives in to his own self-destructive nature, continuing to hurt his relationships with his family.

Cast

 Billy Crystal as Buddy Young Jr.
 David Paymer as Stan Young
 Julie Warner as Elaine Young
 Helen Hunt as Annie Wells
 Jerry Orbach as Phil Gussman
 Ron Silver as Larry Meyerson
 Mary Mara as Susan Young

Cameos
Comedians Jerry Lewis, Carl Ballantine, Slappy White, and Jackie Gayle appear in the New York Friars' Club scene.

Production

Development
The opening title sequence was designed by Elaine Makatura Bass and Saul Bass.

Reception

Critical reception
Mr. Saturday Night received mixed reviews from critics. It holds a 59% rating on Rotten Tomatoes based on 27 reviews with the consensus stating: "Billy Crystal's flawed directorial debut can't seem to decide whether it wants the viewer to love its protagonist or hate him, but it features fine work from Crystal and his co-stars". Audiences polled by CinemaScore gave the film an average grade of "A−" on an A+ to F scale.

Box office 
Mr. Saturday Night was a box office bomb in the United States and Canada, grossing $13.3 million, less than a third of its budget. It grossed $23 million worldwide.

Awards and nominations
At the 65th Academy Awards, David Paymer was nominated for Best Supporting Actor (the film's only nomination). Billy Crystal also hosted the ceremony, during his traditional Best Picture medley, Crystal added the movie to the list, immediately afterwards adding the line, "I just wanted to see how it feels, so sue me."

Home media
 
The film was released twice on DVD, the first time on December 8, 1998 by PolyGram Video, and again on June 4, 2002 by MGM Home Entertainment.

Stage adaptation

On November 10, 2021, it was announced that the film would be adapted into a Broadway musical opening at the Nederlander Theatre the following spring. Crystal would reprise his role as Buddy Young Jr. and write the book with Ganz and Mandel, with music by Jason Robert Brown and lyrics by Amanda Green. Paymer would also reprise his role as Stan. Also in the cast would be Randy Graff as Elaine, and Chasten Harmon as Annie. The show would be directed by John Rando and choreographed by Ellenore Scott.

See also
 List of American films of 1992
 The Comic

References

External links
 
 
 

1992 films
1992 comedy-drama films
American comedy-drama films
Films directed by Billy Crystal
Films scored by Marc Shaiman
Films with screenplays by Babaloo Mandel
Films with screenplays by Lowell Ganz
Films with screenplays by Billy Crystal
Columbia Pictures films
Castle Rock Entertainment films
New Line Cinema films
Saturday Night Live films
Saturday Night Live in the 1990s
Films about entertainers
1992 directorial debut films
1990s English-language films
1990s American films